A swagger stick is a short stick or riding crop usually carried by a uniformed person as a symbol of authority. A swagger stick is shorter than a staff or cane, and is usually made from rattan. Its use derives from the vine staff carried by Roman centurions as an emblem of office.

United Kingdom

In the British Army before World War I, swagger sticks were carried by all other ranks when off duty, as part of their walking out uniform. The stick took the form of a short cane of polished wood, with an ornamented metal head of regimental pattern. The usual custom was for the private soldier or non-commissioned officer (NCO) to carry the stick tucked under his arm. Cavalrymen carried a small riding cane instead of the swagger stick of infantry and other branches. This practice was restricted to the army and Royal Marines, and was never imitated by the other services, although T. E. Lawrence when he had enlisted in the Royal Air Force under the name of Ross, mentions that airmen under training at the RAF Depot at Uxbridge carried swagger sticks. It is thought that this practice was limited to the depot.

Until 1939 swagger sticks were still carried by peacetime regular soldiers when "walking out" of barracks, but the practice ceased with the outbreak of World War II. Uniforms are no longer worn by British army personnel when off-duty, and the swagger stick has accordingly become obsolete.

In the British Army and other military forces following the Commonwealth traditions, commissioned officers of most infantry regiments formerly carried swagger sticks (described as canes) when on duty, whilst warrant officers and senior NCOs carried pace sticks instead. This practice continues in some regiments, especially by warrant officers when in Barrack Dress. Cavalry officers would often carry a riding crop rather than a swagger stick, in deference to their mounted traditions. In some Irish regiments in the British army, such as the Royal Irish Regiment (1992), officers carried a blackthorn walking stick, based on the shillelagh. In the Royal Tank Regiment, officers carried an 'ash plant' or walking stick instead, in reference to World War I tank attacks, when officers would prepare lines of advance by testing the ground's firmness and suitability for tanks.

United States

Swagger sticks were once in vogue in the United States Marine Corps, starting as an informal accessory carried by officers in the late 19th century. In 1915, it gained official approval as recruiters were encouraged to carry them to improve their public image. This tradition grew when Marines deployed for World War I encountered European officers carrying swagger sticks, leading to an entry in the uniform regulations in 1922 authorizing enlisted marines to carry them as well. The usage died down in the 1930s and 40s, with the exception of China Marines, and came back into vogue with a 1952 regulation encouraging them, reaching a peak from 1956 to 1960 when on 4 January 1960, the Commandant, General David M. Shoup, commented on their use with regard to uniforms and equipment.
There is one item of equipment about which I have a definite opinion. It is the swagger stick. It shall remain an optional item of interference. If you feel the need of it, carry it…

Few, if any, contemporary officers carry a swagger stick, and it has no official sanction in any branch.

General George S. Patton carried a swagger stick throughout World War II; however, his contained a concealed blade, similar to a Victorian gentleman's sword cane.

General Paul D. Harkins, United States commander in Vietnam from 1962 to 1964, habitually carried a swagger stick.

General William J. Livsey, who was the commanding general of the Eighth United States Army in South Korea from 1984 to 1987, publicly carried a swagger stick that was carved from wood collected from the poplar tree at the center of the Axe Murder Incident.

See also
Baton (military)
Pace stick
Vine staff
Military rank

References

External links 
 The RSM's Pace Stick & Swagger Sticks
 01 September 1917 article on origins of the Swagger Stick

Law enforcement equipment
British Army equipment
Military equipment of the United Kingdom
Military uniforms
Military equipment of the United States
United States Army equipment
Walking sticks